Dr Thomas Thangathurai William is a Sri Lankan Tamil politician and former Member of Parliament.

He represented the Ampara multi-member electoral district for the Tamil National Alliance (TNA) in the Sri Lankan Parliament between June 2009 and February 2010, having taken over from Kanagasabai Pathmanathan MP, who died in May 2009.

He was a TNA candidate for Ampara District at the 2010 parliamentary election but failed to get elected after coming third amongst the TNA candidates.

References

1944 births
Living people
Sri Lankan Tamil politicians
Sri Lankan Roman Catholics
Members of the 13th Parliament of Sri Lanka
Tamil National Alliance politicians